An Unnecessary Woman is a 2014 novel by the Lebanese American writer Rabih Alameddine. The book was nominated for the National Book Award for Fiction. The novel focuses on the experiences of an isolated 72-year-old woman, Aaliya Saleh, who is a shut-in in Beirut, exploring how she deals with her changing life.

Themes 
Saleh secretly translates Western literature, like Anna Karenina and Austerlitz into Arabic, and makes continual references to authors like Italo Calvino. Within this context the novel, thematically, focuses on the role of the reader in engaging and examining literature. As The Independent describes, "Aaliyah keeps company with her writers – living and dead" instead of people.  The Washington Post explained, "Literature is Aaliya's religion and much of the wonderful humor in 'An Unnecessary Woman' comes from her pithy contempt for those who fail to live up to its sacred precepts."

Reception 
The novel's reception was generally very positive. However, NPR noted that the plot is relatively limited, though the reviewer praised the writing, stating that, "I can't remember the last time I was so gripped simply by a novel's voice." The Guardian's reviewer similarly highlighted how the novel has a very "elastic" voice, as the author narrates the novel with both interior dialogue and other narration strategies. The Guardian concludes positively writing that, "precisely in its strangeness, a genuine literary pleasure: a complicated one." Open Letters Monthly reviewer Steve Donoghue called the novel "infinitely strange" but "smarter and more assured" than Alameddine's last novel The Hakawati. Similarly The Washington Post reviewer called the novel as "epic as its predecessor". The Independent gave the novel a very positive review concluding, "read it once, read it twice, read other books for a decade or so, and then pick it up and read it anew. This one’s a keeper."

References

External links 
 

2014 American novels
Novels by Rabih Alameddine
Novels set in Beirut
Grove Press books